Dutch elm may refer to:
 Ulmus × hollandica, natural hybrid between Wych Elm (Ulmus glabra) and Field Elm (Ulmus minor)
 Ulmus × hollandica 'Major', cultivar of Ulmus × hollandica, introduced to England from the Netherlands
 Ulmus × hollandica 'Belgica', cultivar of Ulmus × hollandica, most common cultivar in the Netherlands

See also
 Dutch elm disease, disease first identified in the Netherlands, which affects all elms, not just Dutch elms.